"Tramp! Tramp! Tramp! (The Prisoner's Hope)" was one of the most popular songs of the American Civil War. George F. Root wrote both the words and music and published it in 1864 to give hope to the Union prisoners of war. The song is written from the prisoner's point of view. The chorus tells his fellow prisoners that hope is coming.

Lyrics

Confederate lyrics
In addition to the original version, soldiers of the Confederate States of America made their own lyrics to the tune. The Confederate lyrics revolve around General Lee's Army of Northern Virginia invading Pennsylvania, following which prisoners held in Northern prison camps shall be liberated.<ref>Confederate lyrics to Tramp! Tramp! Tramp!']'</ref>

In popular culture
The song has been parodied and the melody has been repurposed numerous times:

Religion
 It is well known as the melody for the Christian children's song "Jesus Loves the Little Children".
 The Latter-day Saint hymn "In Our Lovely Deseret" employs the tune as well.

Politics
 It also lends the music to an Irish patriotic song, "God Save Ireland".
 An early variant was "Damn, Damn, Damn the Filipinos", sung during the Spanish–American War and Philippine–American War.
 In 1913, the labor organizer and songwriter Joe Hill (1879–1915) wrote a song for the Industrial Workers of the World to the tune,  called "The Tramp", about a man who is trying to find a job, only to get the universal answer: 'Tramp, tramp, tramp, keep on a-tramping / Nothing doing here for you / If I catch you 'round again / You will wear the ball and chain / Keep on tramping, that's the best thing you can do.'
 In 1914 the melody and meter were used as the basis for the World War I song, Belgium Put the Kibosh on the Kaiser by Mark Sheridan.  
 In 1950, the German anti-US propaganda song Ami – go home! by Ernst Busch was set to this tune (arranged by Hanns Eisler).

Sports
 The melody of this song is used as the second stanza of the Georgetown University Fight Song, collectively known as There Goes Old Georgetown.  
  Club Deportivo Universidad Católica, one of Chile's most important football clubs, has used the music of this song as the official fight song of the "Cruzados Caballeros" since 1943. Also, it has been part of the corporate identity of Channel 13, which served as the startup music of the channel for much of the 1980s, the version used was that of Carlos Haiquel on vocals with mixed chorus, with the orchestral arrangement by Tito Ledermann. The current version was recorded in 1970.
 The melody of this song, as used in God Save Ireland, makes up part of Put 'Em Under Pressure, the official song written to support Ireland's national football team in the 1990 FIFA World Cup.
 The melody of this song, out of 'God Save Ireland' was used as the tune for a novelty record fan-anthem, for the 1978 world cup released as the song Ally's Tartan Army.

Other
 It was the melody of the original song of Sapporo Agricultural College (now Hokkaido University) in Japan.
In the 1933 Laurel and Hardy comedy film Sons of the Desert, the anthem of the Sons of the Desert lounge is a pastiche of several popular tunes, including Tramp! Tramp! Tramp! as well as Give My Regards to Broadway. Bing Crosby included the song in a medley on his album 101 Gang Songs (1961)
 In the TV series M*A*S*H, Hawkeye (played by Alan Alda) twice responds to someone making a thrice repeated complaint (such as "Gripe, gripe, gripe!") by singing the line from the song "the boys are marching". 
 The German band De Höhner use the tune for their song "Dat Hätz vun d'r Welt" (published in 1982), sung in praise of Cologne in the local dialect, Kölsch.
 In the November 26, 2010, edition of the Pickles comic strip, lead character Earl Pickles sings the chorus as a preemptive strike against his wife's urge to sing holiday songs.

References

Bibliography
Root, George R. "Tramp! Tramp! Tramp!" (Sheet music). Chicago: Root & Cady (1864).
Smith, Nicholas, Col. Stories of Great National Songs. Milwaukee, Wis.: The Yound Churchman Co. (1899).

External links
"Tramp! Tramp! Tramp!", Harlan & Stanley (Edison Gold 9439, 1905)—[http://cylinders.library.ucsb.edu/index.php Cylinder Preservation and Digitization Project''. 
The Music of the American Civil War (1861–1865) , Confederate Lyrics
Georgetown University Fight Song 

Songs of the American Civil War
1864 songs
Songs written by George Frederick Root
American Civil War prisoners of war